

Lee A. Davidson (born June 30, 1968) is a Canadian-American former minor professional hockey player and college coach.

Playing career 
Amateur

Davidson played center for the 1985–86 Penticton Knights of the British Columbia Junior Hockey League. The Knights won the 1986 Centennial Cup (now Royal Bank Cup) becoming British Columbia's first Canadian Junior A national champion. Davidson scored 34 goals and had 74 assists for 108 points in 48 regular season games, second highest on the team. In 2011, members of the 1985–86 Penticton Knights were inducted into the British Columbia Hockey Hall of Fame.

Davidson was drafted in the eighth round, 166 overall, by the Washington Capitals in the 1986 NHL Entry Draft. He played collegiately at the University of North Dakota (UND). As a freshman, Davidson’s team captured the NCAA Men's Ice Hockey Championship. For the 1989-90 campaign, he was elected team captain and was selected to both the All-WCHA and NCAA All-American Second Teams. Over four seasons, Davidson scored 80 goals and had 122 assists for 202 points which ranks fifth all-time on UND’s career list. In 2019, Davidson was inducted into the UND Athletic Hall of Fame.

Davidson – a dual citizen of Canada and the United States – played alongside future NHL stars Brian Leetch, Mike Modano, Jeremy Roenick, and John LeClair for Team USA at the 1987 and 1988 World Junior Hockey Championships.

Minor Professional

After graduating from UND, Davidson played for the Winnipeg Jets' minor league affiliate Moncton Hawks of the American Hockey League. From 1991 to 1998, he played for several teams in the International Hockey League (IHL), primarily with the Fort Wayne Komets. In 1993, Davidson and the Komets completed a 12-game playoff sweep of the Cleveland Lumberjacks, Atlanta Knights, and San Diego Gulls to win the Turner Cup. In 1997, Davidson was selected to the IHL All-Star Team. Davidson's final season (1998–99) was played in Europe with the Hannover Scorpions of the Deutsche Eishockey League.

Coaching career 
Following his retirement from active hockey, Davidson returned to UND in 2000 as an assistant coach under Dean Blais. In 2002, he joined UND alumnus Scott Sandelin at the University of Minnesota Duluth as assistant coach for the Bulldogs. Following the 2007-08 season, Davidson resigned from his position commenting that the time commitment of coaching, recruiting and travel was difficult while trying to have a family life. During his six-year tenure, the Bulldogs reached the NCAA Tournament Frozen Four in 2004 and several of his recruits were members of the 2009 Western Collegiate Hockey Association conference tournament champion team and the 2011 NCAA national champion team.

Awards and honors

British Columbia Hockey Hall of Fame Inductee (2011)
University of North Dakota Athletic Hall of Fame Inductee (2019)

References 

1968 births
Living people
Moncton Hawks players
Fort Wayne Komets players
Chicago Wolves (IHL) players
Atlanta Knights players
Hannover Scorpions players
Ice hockey people from Winnipeg
Penticton Knights players
North Dakota Fighting Hawks men's ice hockey players
Washington Capitals draft picks
American men's ice hockey centers
Canadian ice hockey centres
NCAA men's ice hockey national champions
AHCA Division I men's ice hockey All-Americans